H₂weh₁-yú is an Indo European god of the wind. Such a deity is attested in most traditions. The root *h₂weh₁ ("to blow") is at the origin of the two words for the wind: *H₂weh₁-yú- and *H₂w(e)h₁-nt-. The deity is indeed often depicted as a couple in the Indo-Iranian tradition. Vayu-Vāta is a dual divinity in the Avesta, Vāta being associated with the stormy winds and described as coming from everywhere ("from below, from above, from in front, from behind"). Similarly, the Vedic Vāyu, the lord of the winds, is connected in the Vedas with Indra—the king of Svarga Loka (also called Indraloka)—while the other deity Vāta represents a more violent sort of wind and is instead associated with Parjanya—the god of rain and thunder. Other cognates include Hitt. huwant-, Lith. vėjas, Toch. B yente, Lat. uentus, Ger. *windaz, or Welsh gwynt. The slavic Viy is another cognate

He is hypothesized to have been linked to life and death through adding and taking breath from people.

Etymology 
The name H₂weh₁-yú is derived from the reconstructed Proto-Indo-European root *h₂weh₁-, meaning "to blow" or "to breathe".. The suffix *-yú is a reconstructed Proto-Indo-European suffix used to form personal names. Therefore, H₂weh₁-yú can be translated as "the one who blows/breathes".

See Also 

 Wind

Notes

References

Sources

Wind deities
Reconstructed words
Proto-Indo-European deities